The Pillows Presents Special CD is an EP released by The Pillows on October 18, 1993. It was distributed for promotional purposes only and not available through regular retail channels.

Track listing
 "Ano Hi to Onaji Sora no Shita de" (あの日と同じ空の下で)
 "Angel Fish" (エンゼルフィッシュ)
 "Kimi to Futari" (キミと二人)

The Pillows EPs
1993 EPs
Japanese-language EPs